This article shows the 14-player roster of all participating teams at the 2022 FIVB Volleyball Men's World Championship.

Pool A

The following is Ukraine‘s roster for the 2022 FIVB Volleyball Men's World Championship.

Head Coach:  Uģis Krastiņš

1 Timofii Poluian 
2 Maksym Drozd 
4 Oleh Shevchenko 
5 Oleh Plotnytskyi 
7 Horden Brova 
9 Volodymyr Ostapenko 
10 Yurii Semeniuk 
12 Denys Fomin 
13 Vasyl Tupchii 
14 Illia Kovalov 
15 Vitalii Shchytkov 
19 Dmytro Kanaiev 
21 Yevhenii Kisiliuk 
22 Yurii Synytsia

The following is Serbia‘s roster for the 2022 FIVB Volleyball Men's World Championship.

Head Coach:  Igor Kolaković

2 Uroš Kovačević 
4 Nemanja Petrić 
5 Milan Katić 
6 Nikola Peković 
7 Petar Krsmanović 
8 Marko Ivović 
9 Nikola Jovović 
12 Pavle Perić 
14 Aleksandar Atanasijević 
15 Nemanja Mašulović 
18 Marko Podraščanin 
20 Srećko Lisinac 
21 Vuk Todorović 
33 Dušan Petković

The following is Tunisias's roster for the 2022 FIVB Volleyball Men's World Championship.

Head Coach:  Antonio Giacobbe

2 Ahmed Kadhi 
3 Khaled Ben Slimene 
6 Mohamed Ali Ben Othmen Miladi 
7 Elyes Karamosli 
8 Yassine Abdelhedi 
9 Omar Agrebi 
10 Hamza Nagga 
12 Rami Bennour 
13 Selim Mbareki 
16 Mehdi Ben Tahar 
18 Ali Bongui 
19 Aymen Bouguerra 
20 Saddem Hmissi 
21 Taieb Korbosli

The following is Puerto Rico's roster for the 2022 FIVB Volleyball Men's World Championship.

Head Coach:  Ossie Antonetti

2 Klistan Lawrence Vidal 
3 Omar Hoyos 
4 Dennis Del Valle 
5 Pedro Nieves 
6 Gregory Torres Cruzado 
7 Arturo Iglesias 
8 Kevin López 
9 Pedro Molina 
12 Arnel Cabrera 
13 Roque Nido 
14 Pelegrín Vargas 
15 Jonathan Rodríguez 
17 Ismael Alomar 
18 Antonio Elias

Pool B

The following is Brazil's roster for the 2022 FIVB Volleyball Men's World Championship.

Head coach:  Renan Dal Zotto

1 Bruno Rezende 
6 Adriano Cavalcante 
8 Wallace de Souza 
9 Yoandy Leal 
11 Rodrigo Leão 
14 Fernando Kreling 
15 Maique Nascimento 
16 Lucas Saatkamp  
17 Thales Hoss 
18 Ricardo Lucarelli 
19 Leandro Santos 
21 Felipe Roque 
23 Flávio Gualberto 
28 Darlan Souza

The following is Japan's roster for the 2022 FIVB Volleyball Men's World Championship.

Head coach:  Philippe Blain

1 Yuji Nishida 
2 Taishi Onodera 
5 Tatsunori Otsuka 
6 Akihiro Yamauchi 
7 Kenta Takanashi 
8 Masahiro Sekita 
9 Masaki Oya 
12 Ran Takahashi 
13 Tomohiro Ogawa 
14 Yuki Ishikawa 
16 Kento Miyaura 
20 Tomohiro Yamamoto 
23 Shunichiro Sato 
26 Go Murayama

The following is Cuba's roster for the 2022 FIVB Volleyball Men's World Championship.

Head coach:  Nicolas Vives

2 Osniel Melgarejo 
4 Michael Sánchez 
5 Javier Concepción 
7 Yonder García 
9 Liván Osoria 
10 Miguel Gutiérrez 
11 Liván Taboada 
12 Jesús Herrera 
13 Robertlandy Simón 
14 Adrián Goide 
18 Miguel Ángel López 
22 José Miguel Gutiérrez 
23 Marlon Yant 
24 Alain Gourguet

The following is Qatar's roster for the 2022 FIVB Volleyball Men's World Championship.

Head coach:  Camilo Andres Soto

1 Youssef Oughlaf 
3 Ahmed Mahmoud Assam 
4 Renan Ribeiro 
5 Sulaiman Saad 
6 Bojan Djukic 
7 Belal Nabel Abunabot 
9 Miloš Stevanović 
10 Nadir Ababacar Sadikh  
11 Nikola Vasić 
12 Mubarak Dahi 
14 Abdullah Hassanein 
16 Ibrahim Ibrahim 
17 Gamal Ahmed Noaman 
21 Abdulwahid Wagihalla Osman

Pool C

The following is Poland's roster for the 2022 FIVB Volleyball Men's World Championship.

Head Coach:  Nikola Grbić

3 Jakub Popiwczak 
5 Łukasz Kaczmarek 
6 Bartosz Kurek 
7 Karol Kłos 
12 Grzegorz Łomacz 
14 Aleksander Śliwka 
15 Jakub Kochanowski 
16 Kamil Semeniuk 
17 Paweł Zatorski 
18 Bartosz Kwolek 
19 Marcin Janusz 
20 Mateusz Bieniek 
21 Tomasz Fornal 
72 Mateusz Poręba

The following is United States' roster for the 2022 FIVB Volleyball Men's World Championship.

Head Coach:  John Speraw

1 Matt Anderson 
2 Aaron Russell 
4 Jeffrey Jendryk 
5 Kyle Ensing 
8 Torey DeFalco 
11 Micah Christenson 
15 Kyle Russell 
16 Joshua Tuaniga 
18 Garrett Muagututia 
19 Taylor Averill 
20 David Smith 
21 Mason Briggs 
22 Erik Shoji 
23 Cody Kessel

The following is Mexico's roster for the 2022 FIVB Volleyball Men's World Championship.

Head Coach:  Jorge Azair

1 José Mendoza Perdomo 
3 Hiram Bravo Moreno 
4 Raynel Ferrán Romero 
6 Josué López Ríos 
7 Diego González Castañeda 
8 Edgar Mendoza Burgueño 
9 Axel Téllez Rodríguez 
12 Mauro Fuentes Rascón 
14 Jonathan Martínez García 
15 Christian Aranda 
16 Miguel Chávez Pasos 
18 Yasutaka Sanay Heredia 
20 Luis Hernández Baca 
21 Brandon López Ríos

The following is Bulgaria's roster for the 2022 FIVB Volleyball Men's World Championship.

Head Coach:  Nikolay Jeliazkov

1 Denis Karyagin 
2 Stefan Chavdarov 
3 Nikolay Kolev 
4 Martin Atanasov 
5 Svetoslav Gotsev 
7 Dobromir Dimitrov 
8 Todor Skrimov 
9 Georgi Seganov 
11 Aleks Grozdanov 
14 Asparuh Asparuhov 
16 Vladislav Ivanov 
18 Svetoslav Ivanov 
19 Tsvetan Sokolov 
23 Aleksandar Nikolov

Pool D

The following is France's roster for the 2022 FIVB Volleyball Men's World Championship.

Head coach:  Andrea Giani

1 Barthélémy Chinenyeze 
2 Jenia Grebennikov 
4 Jean Patry 
6 Benjamin Toniutti 
7 Kévin Tillie 
9 Earvin N'Gapeth 
11 Antoine Brizard 
12 Stéphen Boyer 
14 Nicolas Le Goff 
15 Médéric Henry 
17 Trévor Clévenot 
19 Yacine Louati 
20 Benjamin Diez 
25 Quentin Jouffroy

The following is Slovenia's roster for the 2022 FIVB Volleyball Men's World Championship.

Head coach:  Gheorghe Crețu

1 Tonček Štern 
2 Alen Pajenk 
4 Jan Kozamernik 
6 Mitja Gasparini 
9 Dejan Vinčić 
10 Sašo Štalekar 
11 Danijel Koncilja 
12 Jan Klobučar 
13 Jani Kovačič 
14 Žiga Štern 
16 Gregor Ropret 
17 Tine Urnaut 
18 Klemen Čebulj 
19 Rok Možič

The following is Germany's roster for the 2022 FIVB Volleyball Men's World Championship.

Head coach:  Michał Winiarski

1 Christian Fromm 
3 Ruben Schott 
5 Moritz Reichert 
7 David Sossenheimer 
10 Julian Zenger 
11 Lukas Kampa 
14 Moritz Karlitzek 
17 Jan Zimmermann 
18 Florian Krage 
20 Linus Weber 
21 Tobias Krick 
22 Tobias Brand 
25 Lukas Maase 
45 Jakob Günthör

The following is Cameroon's roster for the 2022 FIVB Volleyball Men's World Championship.

Head coach: Guy-Roger Nanga

1 Elie Badawe Djakode 
2 Ahmed Awal 
3 Arnaud Amabaya 
5 Joseph Kofane Boyomo 
6 Sem Dolegombai 
8 Christophe Mandeng Adjessa 
9 Cedric Bitouna 
10 Didier Sali Hile 
11 Jeremie Deffo Sobwen 
12 Kevin Bassoko 
14 Yaoussi Kavogo 
15 Yvan Kody Bitjaa 
18 Nelson Djam 
20 Christian Voukeng Mbativou

Pool E

The following is Italy's roster for the 2022 FIVB Volleyball Men's World Championship.

Head coach:  Ferdinando De Giorgi

1 Giulio Pinali 
3 Francesco Recine 
5 Alessandro Michieletto 
6 Simone Giannelli 
7 Fabio Balaso 
8 Riccardo Sbertoli 
12 Mattia Bottolo 
14 Gianluca Galassi 
15 Daniele Lavia 
16 Yuri Romanò 
17 Simone Anzani 
19 Roberto Russo 
24 Leonardo Scanferla 
30 Leandro Mosca

The following is Canada's roster for the 2022 FIVB Volleyball Men's World Championship.

Head coach:  Benjamin Josephson

3 Derek Epp 
4 Nicholas Hoag 
5 Eric Loeppky 
7 Stephen Timothy Maar 
8 Brett Walsh 
10 Ryan Sclater 
11 Pearson Eshenko 
12 Lucas Van Berkel 
17 Ryley Barnes 
19 Brodie Hofer 
20 Arthur Szwarc 
21 Jackson Howe 
22 Steven Marshall 
24 Mathias Elser

The following is Turkey's roster for the 2022 FIVB Volleyball Men's World Championship.

Head coach: Nedim Özbey

3 Metin Toy 
5 Baturalp Burak Güngör 
6 Arda Bostan 
8 Burutay Subaşı 
9 Mirza Lagumdzija 
10 Arslan Ekşi 
12 Adis Lagumdzija 
14 Faik Samet Güneş 
19 Berkay Bayraktar 
24 Ahmet Tümer 
25 Kaan Gürbüz 
53 Volkan Döne 
66 Doğukan Ulu 
77 Bedirhan Bülbül

The following is China's roster for the 2022 FIVB Volleyball Men's World Championship.

Head coach:  Wu Sheng

1 Dai Qingyao 
4 Yang Yiming 
5 Zhang Binglong 
6 Yu Yuantai 
7 Yu Yaochen 
8 Yang Tianyuan 
9 Li Yongzhen 
10 Liu Meng 
12 Zhang Zhejia 
15 Peng Shikun 
19 Zhang Guanhua 
21 Miao Ruantong 
22 Zhang Jingyin 
27 Wang Bin

Pool F

The following is Argentina's roster for the 2022 FIVB Volleyball Men's World Championship.

Head coach:  Marcelo Méndez

 
1 Matías Sánchez 
3 Jan Martínez Franchi 
4 Joaquín Gallego 
7 Facundo Conte  
8 Agustín Loser 
9 Santiago Danani 
12 Bruno Lima 
13 Ezequiel Palacios 
15 Luciano De Cecco 
16 Luciano Palonsky 
17 Luciano Vicentín 
18 Martín Ramos 
22 Nicolás Zerba 
25 Pablo Koukartsev

The following is Iran's roster for the 2022 FIVB Volleyball Men's World Championship.

Head coach: Behrouz Ataei

 
1 Mahdi Jelveh 
2 Milad Ebadipour 
5 Amir Hossein Toukhteh 
7 Shahrooz Homayonfarmanesh 
8 Mohammad Reza Hazratpour 
9 Mohammadreza Moazzen 
11 Saber Kazemi 
12 Amirhossein Esfandiar 
14 Mohammad Javad Manavinejad 
15 Aliasghar Mojarad 
17 Amin Esmaeilnejad 
18 Mohammad Taher Vadi 
24 Javad Karimisouchelmaei 
49 Morteza Sharifi

The following is Netherlands's roster for the 2022 FIVB Volleyball Men's World Championship.

Head coach:  Roberto Piazza

 
2 Wessel Keemink 
3 Maarten van Garderen 
4 Thijs ter Horst 
5 Luuc Van Der Ent 
7 Gijs Jorna 
8 Fabian Plak 
12 Bennie Tuinstra 
13 Mats Bleeker 
14 Nimir Abdel-Aziz 
16 Wouter ter Maat 
17 Michaël Parkinson 
18 Robbert Andringa 
19 Freek de Weijer 
22 Twan Wiltenburg

The following is Egypt's roster for the 2022 FIVB Volleyball Men's World Championship.

Head coach:   Hassan Elhossary

 
1 Ahmed El Sayed 
5 Abdelrahman Seoudy 
6 Mohamed Hassan 
8 Abdelrahman Elhossiny Eissa 
10 Mohamed Masoud  
11 Mohamed Noureldin 
12 Hossam Abdalla 
13 Mohamed Khater 
15 Ahmed Elkotb 
17 Reda Haikal 
18 Ahmed Shafik 
22 Mohamed Moustafa Issa 
23 Ahmed Omar 
25 Mohamed Magdi Ali

See also

 2022 FIVB Volleyball Women's World Championship squads

References

External links
Teams

S
FIVB Volleyball Men's World Championship squads